The Carpenters: Music, Music, Music is a Carpenters television special from 1980.  It included guest stars such as Ella Fitzgerald, John Davidson and Nelson Riddle and his orchestra.

Music 
Karen, Richard, Ella, and John sang "Without a Song" in the beginning. Other songs performed were:
"A Song for You" (Karen and Richard)
"Without a Song" (Karen, Richard, Ella and John)
"I Got Rhythm Medley" (Karen, Richard and other dancers)
"Ain't Misbehavin'" (Ella Fitzgerald)
"Dizzy Fingers" (Richard Carpenter)
"You'll Never Know" (John Davidson)
"Medley" This Masquerade / My Funny Valentine / I'll Be Seeing You / Someone to Watch Over Me / As Time Goes By / Don't Get Around Much Anymore / I Let a Song Go Out of My Heart (Karen and Ella)
"Piano Solo" (Richard Carpenter)
"When I Fall in Love" (Karen Carpenter)
"You're Just in Love" (Karen Carpenter and John Davidson)
"How High The Moon - Jazz Scat" (Ella Fitzgerald)
"1980 Carpenters Medley" (Karen and Richard Carpenter, Nelson Riddle and his Orchestra)

References

External links 
 

Music, Music, Music
Music television specials
1980 television specials
1980s American television specials